Thomas Timothy Tierney (1875 – unknown) was an English footballer who played in the Football League for Blackburn Rovers, Gainsborough Trinity, New Brighton Tower and Northwich Victoria.

References

1875 births
date of death unknown
English footballers
Association football forwards
English Football League players
Witton Albion F.C. players
Northwich Victoria F.C. players
Chorley F.C. players
Blackburn Rovers F.C. players
Luton Town F.C. players
Gainsborough Trinity F.C. players
Barrow A.F.C. players
Glentoran F.C. players
Watford F.C. players
Sportspeople from Chester